Halverson is a surname and may refer to:

 Ben Halverson (1863–1933), American politician
 Bob Halverson (1937–2016), Australian politician
 C. A. Halverson (1886-1947), American politician
 Courtney Halverson (born 1989), American actress 
 Dave Halverson, American video game journalist
 David D. Halverson, American general
 Eliot Halverson (born 1990), American figure skater
 Richard C. Halverson (1916–1995), American theologian
 Ronald T. Halverson (1936-2017), American politician
 Trevor Halverson (born 1971), Canadian ice hockey forward